Elizabeth Sutton may refer to:
Lizzie Sutton, fictional character in the TV series, Lincoln Heights
Betty Sutton (born 1963), politician from Ohio